Vetle Walle Egeli (born 2 February 2004) is a Norwegian footballer who plays as a midfielder for Sandefjord.

Club career
Born in Larvik, Egeli spent his youth career with the academies of Nanset IF and Sandefjord. After the Sandefjord squad was hit with injuries, Egeli was given the chance in the first team.

International career
Egeli has represented Norway at under-17 and under-18 level.

Personal life
Egeli is the brother of fellow professional footballer Sindre Walle Egeli.

Career statistics

Club

Notes

References

2004 births
Living people
People from Larvik
Norwegian footballers
Norway youth international footballers
Association football midfielders
Norwegian Fourth Division players
Eliteserien players
Sandefjord Fotball players